Nine Mile is an unincorporated community in Lafayette Township, Allen County, in the U.S. state of Indiana.

History
A post office was established at Nine Mile in 1855, and remained in operation until it was discontinued in 1904.

Geography

References

Unincorporated communities in Allen County, Indiana
Unincorporated communities in Indiana
Fort Wayne, IN Metropolitan Statistical Area